Falkušovce is a village and municipality in Michalovce District in the Kosice Region of eastern Slovakia.

History
In historical records the village was first mentioned in 1290.

Geography
The village lies at an altitude of 104 metres and covers an area of  (2020-06-30/-07-01).

Ethnicity
It has a population of 659 people (2020-12-31).
The population is about 95% Slovak in ethnicity.

Government

The village relies on the tax and district offices, and fire brigade at Michalovce and the police force at Trhovište.

Culture
The village has a small public library, a post office, and food stores.

Sports
The village has a football pitch.

Transport
The nearest railway station is 6 kilometres away.

Genealogical resources

The records for genealogical research are available at the state archive "Statny Archiv in Presov, Slovakia"

 Roman Catholic church records (births/marriages/deaths): 1788-1897 (parish B)
 Greek Catholic church records (births/marriages/deaths): 1786-1922 (parish A)
 Reformated church records (births/marriages/deaths): 1761-1896 (parish B)

See also
 List of municipalities and towns in Slovakia

References

External links
https://web.archive.org/web/20071217080336/http://www.statistics.sk/mosmis/eng/run.html
 Surnames of living people in Falkusovce

Villages and municipalities in Michalovce District